Oddbjørn Hagen (3 February 1908 – 25 June 1983) was a Norwegian skier who competed in nordic combined and cross-country skiing. He was both Olympic and World champion.

Olympic Games
At the 1936 Winter Olympics, Hagen won one gold in the Nordic combined and two silvers in cross-country skiing. The cross-country relay event saw its first Olympic appearance in 1936. Hagen had the first leg, and finished his leg one minute ahead of Finland's Sulo Nurmela, with Sweden's John Berger fifteen seconds further behind. Kalle Jalkanen on the final leg secured Finland the relay victory, six seconds before the Norwegian team.

The 18 kilometre cross-country skiing race was also the first part of the Nordic combined. Hagen finished second in the 18 km, behind Sweden's Erik August Larsson, earning him a silver medal. After the ski jumping the next day, he secured the gold medal in the combined.

World Championships
At the FIS Nordic World Ski Championships, Hagen won golds in the individual Nordic combined (1934, 1935) and silvers in the men's 4 × 10 km relay and the men's 18 km (both 1935). Hagen's consecutive world championships in Nordic combined would not be repeated until fellow Norwegian Bjarte Engen Vik won the event in 1999 and 2001. In the 4 × 10 km relay in Sollefteå in 1934, Hagen had the final leg, and while battling with Sweden's Arthur Häggblad for the silver medal they both got off course and lost ten minutes. The two were passed by Germany, and Hagen finished fourth behind the Swedish team.

Holmenkollen
At the Holmenkollen ski festival, Hagen won the Nordic combined event three times (1932, 1934, and 1935). For his Nordic combined successes at the Olympics, Holmenkollen, and World Championships, Hagen earned the Holmenkollen medal in 1934.

Hagen hailed from Ytre Rendal, and competed for Bækkelagets SK in Oslo. He received the King's Cup five times. His strongest discipline was cross-country skiing, while his results in ski jumping were steady, but not outstanding. Most of his life he worked as a workshop manager in Oslo.

Cross-country skiing results
All results are sourced from the International Ski Federation (FIS).

Olympic Games
 2 medals – (2 silver)

World Championships
 2 medals – (2 silver)

References

External links

  (Nordic combined)
  (Cross-country skiing)
  – click Holmenkollmedaljen for downloadable pdf file 
  – click Vinnere for downloadable pdf file 
 IOC Profile

1908 births
1983 deaths
People from Rendalen
Cross-country skiers at the 1936 Winter Olympics
Nordic combined skiers at the 1936 Winter Olympics
Holmenkollen medalists
Holmenkollen Ski Festival winners
Norwegian male cross-country skiers
Olympic cross-country skiers of Norway
Norwegian male Nordic combined skiers
Olympic Nordic combined skiers of Norway
Olympic gold medalists for Norway
Olympic silver medalists for Norway
Olympic medalists in cross-country skiing
Olympic medalists in Nordic combined
FIS Nordic World Ski Championships medalists in cross-country skiing
FIS Nordic World Ski Championships medalists in Nordic combined
Medalists at the 1936 Winter Olympics
Sportspeople from Innlandet
20th-century Norwegian people